Merry Wives of Reno is a 1934 American pre-Code comedy film directed by H. Bruce Humberstone and starring Guy Kibbee, Glenda Farrell, Donald Woods, Margaret Lindsay, Hugh Herbert, Frank McHugh and Ruth Donnelly. The film was released by Warner Bros. on May 12, 1934.

The plot and cast number are similar to the lost 1933 film Convention City. Robert Lord was a writer in both films, though this one is not nearly as risque and racy.

Plot
Madge (Margaret Lindsay) and Lois (Ruth Donnelly) take the train from New York City to Reno, NV to get quickie divorces from their husbands.

Cast 

 Guy Kibbee as Tom
 Glenda Farrell as Bunny
 Donald Woods as Frank
 Margaret Lindsay as Madge
 Hugh Herbert as Colonel Fitch
 Frank McHugh as Al
 Ruth Donnelly as Lois
 Roscoe Ates as The Trapper (as Rosco Ates)
 Hobart Cavanaugh as Derwent
 Irving Bacon as Cook (scenes deleted)
 Louise Beavers as Derwent's Client - Black Mother of 12 Wanting a Divorce (uncredited)
 Edna Bennett as First Beautician (uncredited)
 Raymond Brown as Pullman Conductor (uncredited)
 Dorothy Christy as Derwent's Client - Hubert's Divorce Seeking Wife (uncredited)
 Ray Cooke as Mickey - Bellhop (uncredited)
 Joseph Crehan as Train Conductor (uncredited)
 Mary Currier as Mrs. Dillingworth (uncredited)
 Mary Doran as Lady with Tennis Player (uncredited)
 Lester Dorr as Hotel Lobby Guest (uncredited)
 Claire Du Brey as Woman Hoping for a Good Dentist (uncredited)
 Jay Eaton as Man with Rich Dowager (uncredited)
 Bill Elliott as Train Passenger (uncredited)
 Helena Phillips Evans as Derwent's Alimony Seeking Client (uncredited)
 Betty Farrington as Mrs. Derwent (uncredited)
 Bess Flowers as Lady Getting Off Train Who Wants to Find Court House (uncredited)
 Dick French as Tom's Party Guest (uncredited)
 Anita Garvin as Male-Seeking Woman in Hotel Lobby (uncredited)
 June Glory as Girl on the Train in Reno (uncredited)
 Lorena Layson as Telephone Operator (uncredited)
 Mary MacLaren as Hotel Party Guest (uncredited)
 Hattie McDaniel as Bunny's Maid (uncredited)
 Addie McPhail as Mrs. Dillingworth (uncredited)
 Geneva Mitchell as Woman in Hotel (uncredited)
 Bert Moorhouse as Tom's Party Guest (uncredited)
 Vivien Oakland as Mrs. Peabody (uncredited)
 Inez Palange as Italian Woman (uncredited)
 Richard Powell as Diner Customer (uncredited)
 Russ Powell as Proprietor of Jim's Diner (uncredited)
 Donna Mae Roberts as Girl on the Train in Reno (uncredited)
 Rosalie Roy as Girl on the Train in Reno (uncredited)
 Harry Seymour as The Waiter at the Willows (uncredited)
 Victoria Vinton as Girl Who Asks for a Match (uncredited)
 Ruth Warren as Second Beautician (uncredited)
 Renee Whitney as Telephone Operator (uncredited)
 Lottie Williams as Generous Passerby (uncredited)

Box office
According to Warner Bros records the film earned $220,000 domestically and $103,000 internationally.

References

External links
 
 
 
 

1934 comedy films
American comedy films
1934 films
American black-and-white films
Warner Bros. films
1930s American films